Richard Arthur Henry Mitchell (22 January 1843 - 19 April 1905), widely known as Mike Mitchell, was an English schoolmaster and amateur cricketer who played first-class cricket from 1861 to 1883 and supervised the Eton cricket team for more than thirty years.

Life
Mitchell was educated at Eton and played for the school cricket team from 1858 to 1861, being captain in the latter year. From Eton he went to Balliol College, Oxford to read modern history. As a cricketer he won a Blue in all four years at the university, and was the Oxford captain for all but his first year.  While he was in his third year at Balliol, his father suffered financial ruin, and Mitchell had the unexpected task of finding a livelihood. He switched courses from history to classics and secured a second-class honours degree which enabled him to gain appointment as a master at Eton in 1866, remaining there until compelled by ill-health to retire in 1901. Between 1866 and 1897 he was the principal adviser and coach of the school's cricket team. He was a member of the Marylebone Cricket Club (MCC) Committee from 1902 until his death three years later. A later Eton master, G. W. Lyttleton, who as a schoolboy had played cricket under Mitchell's supervision, considered him a philistine housemaster: "unless you were a dab at some game you cut no ice". Among Mitchell's Etonian protégés was George Harris, who as Lord Harris became one of the most influential of cricket administrators.

Mitchell married Mary Henrietta Ley, the second daughter of Henry Ley, Clerk of the House of Commons. Mitchell was the father of the courtier and cricketer Sir Frank Mitchell.

Career
Mitchell was a right-handed batsman, occasional wicket-keeper and right arm medium pace roundarm bowler. Mainly associated with the Eton Ramblers, Oxford University and Marylebone Cricket Club (MCC), he made 57 known appearances in first-class matches. He played for the Gentlemen in the Gentlemen v Players series. He was regarded by Haygarth as one of the leading players of his era. After leaving Oxford, he usually was only seen in important cricket at the Canterbury Festival where he made 21 appearances up to 1883.

Notes

References

External links
 CricketArchive profile

Further reading
 H S Altham, A History of Cricket, Volume 1 (to 1914), George Allen & Unwin, 1962
 Arthur Haygarth, Scores & Biographies, Volumes 1-11 (1744-1870), Lillywhite, 1862-72

1843 births
1905 deaths
English cricketers of 1826 to 1863
English cricketers of 1864 to 1889
English cricketers
Gentlemen cricketers
Gentlemen of the North cricketers
I Zingari cricketers
Marylebone Cricket Club cricketers
North of the Thames v South of the Thames cricketers
North v South cricketers
Oxford University cricketers
People educated at Eton College
Teachers at Eton College
Gentlemen of England cricketers
Alumni of Balliol College, Oxford
Schoolteachers from Leicestershire
Old Oxonians cricketers
Gentlemen of Marylebone Cricket Club cricketers